The 2014 European Table Tennis Championships were held in Lisbon, Portugal from 24–28 September 2014. The venue for the competition was MEO Arena. The competition only had team events for men and women. The competition also served as qualification event for the 2015 European Games. The Portuguese team won the Championship for the first time.

Participating teams
Division groupings were based on placements in the 2013 European Championships.

Medal summary

Results

Men

Preliminary round

Group A

Group B

Group C

Group D

Championship bracket

Women

Preliminary round

Group A

Group B

Group C

Group D

Championship bracket

References

European Table Tennis Championships
European Table Tennis Championships
International sports competitions hosted by Portugal
Table Tennis Championships, European
Table tennis in Portugal
Sports competitions in Lisbon
September 2014 sports events in Europe
2010s in Lisbon